Yunnan Nationalities University is located in  121 Yi Er Yi Da Jie, Wuhua Qu, Kunming, Yunnan, China.

History
Formerly  known as Yunnan Nationalities Institute when established on August 1, 1951, the university was founded in part to instruct government leaders to assist minority ethnic groups of Yunnan to ensure their political rights.

The school was renamed Yunnan Nationalities University (YNU) on April 16, 2003. Subsequent university goals have included the need to cultivate professional support for ethnic groups to ensure political, economic and cultural development and to foster international outreach.

Yunnan Nationalities University has established cooperative relations with 26 universities in 10 nations, including Baylor University and University of Virginia, USA; University of Bergen, Norway; and La Trobe University, Australia.

Since its establishment, the university has received over 20,000 students and scholars from over 80 countries, visiting to study or to conduct academic exchanges and scientific research.

In February 1993, Yunnan Provincial People's Government ranked the institute as a key university of the province.

Programs
Yunnan Nationalities University is composed of 17 schools and departments that provide 22 four-year program majors, two three-year program majors, and three higher professional education majors.

The following departments conduct active educational and research opportunities:

Department of Chinese Language & Literature: Chinese Language & Literature (four-year program)
Department of Languages & Literature of Minority Ethnic Groups: Ethnic Language & Literature, Civil Secretary (three-year higher professional education program)
Department of English Language & Literature: English Language & Literature (four-year program)
Department of Southeast Asian Languages: Burmese, Thai, Vietnamese (four-year program)
Department of Economic Management: Economics, Human Resources Management (four-year program)
Department of Political Science & Law: Political Science & Management, Law (four-year program)
Department of History: History, Ethnology (four-year program)
Department of Tourism: Tourism Management (four-year program)
Department of Mathematics & Computer Science: Mathematics & Applied Mathematics, Computer Science & Technology (four-year program)
Department of Physics: Physics (four-year program)
Department of Information & Electric Engineering: Electric Engineering & Automatization, Electrical Information Engineering (four-year program)
Department of Chemistry: Chemistry, Applied Chemistry (four-year program)
Department of Ethnic Art: Ethnic Fine Arts (four-year program), Ethnic music & Dance (three-year program)
Department of Physical Education: Physical Education (four-year program)
School for People's Armed Forces: People's Armed Forces (three-year program), Law, Civil Secretary, Tourist Guide (three-year higher professional education program)
School of Preparatory University Education: The department offers subjects for high school graduates from ethnic groups who can directly attend a four-year or three-year program of higher education after one year's study. This is a special program and an import part of higher education for minority ethnic groups in China.
School of Continuing Education: The school consists of the Department of Leaders Training and the Department of Evening & Correspondence Education. The majors of the school include Chinese Language & Literature, History, Civil Secretary, Law, Physics, Mathematics, Ideological & Political Education, Administration, Finance, Market Management, Commercial Accounting and so on (two-year or three-year program). In addition, the school offers Economics (four-year program) for high school graduates and Chinese (four-year program) for diploma course graduates.
Department of College English Teaching & Research, Division of Marxism Teaching, the Audio-visual Education Center, the Computing Center, the Moral Teaching & Research Division and the Psychology Teaching & Research Division offer no majors and are only responsible for the teaching of public courses of the university.

Graduate programs

Ethnology
Ethnic History
National Economy
Ethnic Languages & Literature of Chinese-Tibetan Language Branch
Ethnic Languages & Literature of Zhuang-Dong Language Branch
Ethnic Languages & Literature of Southeast Asian Language Branch
Sociology
Religious Studies

Research
Research includes three key disciplines: Languages & Literature of Minority Ethnic Groups, Ethnic Ancient Books Studies, and National Economy.

Instruction includes five key courses on the provincial level: An Outline of Ethnology, The Socialist Construction of China, Theories & Policies Concerning Ethnic Groups, and Organic Chemistry

Research institutions resident at the university:

The Academy of Ethnic Studies and the Visual Anthropology Study Center
Academy of Languages & Literature of Minority Ethnic Groups
Academy of national Economy under the administration of the Department of Economic Management
The Ethnic Law Study Center and the Ethnic Theories Study Center
The Southeast Asia Studies Center

Staff
YNU has a staff of more than 870, of which 428 are teachers and more than 60 are professional researchers, with 36 being full professors and 215 associate professors. The honorary professors of the institute include Ji Xianlin and Zhou Yiliang, council members of the National Board of Education, Dai Ruwei, Ding Xiaqi and Yan Luguang, academicians of the Chinese Academy of Social Sciences, Liu Yaohan and Xu Qingzhang, nationally recognized educators of China.

Campus and facilities
YNU has a land area of nearly 27 hectares and a floor area of 139,976 square meters. The institute has ample facilities for teaching. Its library include 710,000 books, over 2,000 journals and magazines, and a rare collection of ancient texts for ethnic studies including the Beiye Scriptures and the Dongba Scriptures.

Also associated with the university is the book center which the Asian Foundation established in China, including 41,557 books donated by the foundation. The museum inventory includes valuable ethnic relics (30,000 pieces) enabling local and foreign research.

External links
 https://web.archive.org/web/20080607031611/http://www.ynni.edu.cn:80/index/
 http://www.chinatefl.com/yunnan/study/ynmzdxzy.html
 https://web.archive.org/web/20080914055210/http://www.ynni.edu.cn:80/index/
 https://web.archive.org/web/20111004080616/http://www.chinakunming.travel/show.aspx?aid=4493

Universities and colleges in Kunming
Educational institutions established in 1951
1951 establishments in China
Minzu Universities